The 2000 Toronto International Film Festival, the 25th annual festival, ran from September 7 to September 16, 2000. Along with special events to commemorate the anniversary, there were a total of 330 films screened. There was a special screening of Sergei Eisenstein's Alexander Nevsky featuring musical accompaniment by the Toronto Symphony Orchestra with the Toronto Mendelssohn Choir. Also, 25 digital video shorts were made by attending filmmakers.

Awards

Programmes

Gala Presentations
 Almost Famous by Cameron Crowe
 Best In Show by Christopher Guest
 Bread and Tulips by Silvio Soldini
 The Contender by Rod Lurie
 Crouching Tiger, Hidden Dragon by Ang Lee
 The Dish by Rob Sitch
 Dr. T and the Women by Robert Altman
 The House of Mirth by Terence Davies
 How to Kill Your Neighbor's Dog by Michael Kalesniko
 In the Mood for Love by Wong Kar-wai
 The Luzhin Defence by Marleen Gorris
 Men of Honor by George Tillman Jr.
 Pandaemonium by Julien Temple
 Sexy Beast by Jonathan Glazer
 Stardom by Denys Arcand
 La Veuve de Saint-Pierre by Patrice Leconte
 The Weight of Water by Kathryn Bigelow

Special Presentations
 Beautiful by Sally Field
 Before Night Falls by Julian Schnabel
 Chinese Coffee by Al Pacino
 Dancing at the Blue Iguana by Michael Radford
 Duets by Bruce Paltrow
 Faithless by Liv Ullmann
 Greenfingers by Joel Hershman
 Innocence by Paul Cox
 ivansxtc. (To Live and Die in Hollywood) by Bernard Rose
 Liam by Stephen Frears
 Lumumba by Raoul Peck
 Pollock by Ed Harris
 Possible Worlds by Robert Lepage
 Princes et princesses by Michel Ocelot
 The Princess and the Warrior by Tom Tykwer
 Shadow of the Vampire by E. Elias Merhige
 A Shot at Glory by Michael Corrente
 Sous le sable by François Ozon
 State and Main by David Mamet
 Tigerland by Joel Schumacher
 The Yards by James Gray
 You Can Count on Me by Kenneth Lonergan

Masters
 Bread and Roses by Ken Loach
 Brother by Takeshi Kitano
 La Captive by Chantal Akerman
 Chunhyang by Im Kwontaek
 Code Inconnu by Michael Haneke
 Comédie de l'innocence by Raoul Ruiz
 Gohatto by Nagisa Oshima
 The Legends of Rita by Volker Schlöndorff
 Merci pour le chocolat by Claude Chabrol
 My Generation by Barbara Kopple
 Such is Life by Arturo Ripstein
 Turbulence by Ruy Guerra
 Werckmeister Harmonies by Béla Tarr
 The Wrestlers by Buddhadeb Dasgupta
 Yi Yi (A One and a Two) by Edward Yang

Perspective Canada
 Abe's Manhood by Aubrey Nealon
 After Eden by John Price
 Atomic Saké by Louise Archambault
 The Basement Girl by Midi Onodera
 Bowie: One in a Million by Janis Cole
 Clean Rite Cowboy by Michael Downing
 De l'art et la manière chez Denys Arcand by Georges Dufaux
 Deeply by Sheri Elwood
 Desire by Colleen Murphy
 Dinky Menace by Robert Kennedy
 Ernest by Keith Behrman
 FILM(lode) by Deco Dawson
 Foxy Lady, Wild Cherry by Ines Buchli
 Ginger Snaps by John Fawcett
 The Hat (Le Chapeau) by Michèle Cournoyer
 Hindsight by Susan Shipton
 Landscaping by Paul Carrière
 The Law of Enclosures by John Greyson
 The Left-Hand Side of the Fridge by Philippe Falardeau
 Like a Dream that Vanishes by Barbara Sternberg
 The Lost Bundefjord Expedition by Matt Holm
 Love Come Down by Clement Virgo
 Low Self-Esteem Girl by Blaine Thurier
 Maelström by Denis Villeneuve
 Marine Life by Anne Wheeler
 Monday with the Martins by Jeffery Erbach
 Moon Palace by David Weaver
 New Neighbours by Anita McGee
 Parsley Days by Andrea Dorfman
 Passengers by Francine Zuckerman
 The Perfect Son by Leonard Farlinger
 Poe by Gregory Nixon
 Red Deer by Anthony Couture
 Rocks at Whiskey Trench by Alanis Obomsawin
 Saint Jude by John L'Ecuyer
 Sea in the Blood by Richard Fung
 Subrosa by Helen Lee
 Suspicious River by Lynne Stopkewich
 Take-Out by Jean-François Monette
 Three Stories from the End of Everything by Semi Chellas
 Traces dans le rocher du lointain by Majdi El-Omari
 Two Thousand and None by Arto Paragamian
 The Uncles by James Allodi
 Via Crucis by Serge Denoncourt
 The Walnut Tree by Elida Schogt
 Waydowntown by Gary Burns
 We All Fall Down by Martin Cummins
 What About Me: The Rise of the Nihilist Spasm Band by Zev Asher
 When Morning Comes by Charles Officer

Contemporary World Cinema
 Aberdeen by Hans Petter Moland
 Amores Perros by Alejandro González Iñárritu
 Angels of the Universe by Fridrik Thór Fridriksson
 April Captains by Maria de Medeiros
 Attraction by Russell DeGrazier
 Better Than Sex by Jonathan Teplitzky
 Billy Elliot by Stephen Daldry
 Blackboards by Samira Makhmalbaf
 Born Romantic by David Kane
 Brave New Land by Lúcia Murat
 Burnt Money by Marcelo Piñeyro
 Chasing Sleep by Michael Walker
 The Circle by Jafar Panahi
 Clouds of May by Nuri Bilge Ceylan
 Collision Course by Roberval Duarte
 Daily Bread by Ane Muñoz Mitxelena
 The Debt by Krzysztof Krauze
 Les Destinées Sentimentales by Olivier Assayas
 Djomeh by Hassan Yektapanah
 Dog Food by Carlos Siguion-Reyna
 Durian Durian by Fruit Chan
 Eistenstein by Renny Bartlett
 Eureka by Shinji Aoyama
 Face by Junji Sakamoto
 Farewell by Jan Schütte
 Fast Food, Fast Women by Amos Kollek
 The Film Biker by Mel Chionglo
 Flower of Manila by Joel Lamangan
 Freedom by Sharunas Bartas
 Friends Have Reasons by Gerardo Herrero
 Girlfight by Karyn Kusama
 The Goddess of 1967 by Clara Law
 Gojoe by Sogo Ishii
 Harry, un ami qui vous veut du bien by Dominik Moll
 Hey Ram by Kamal Haasan
 Holdup by Florian Flicker
 Hunters in the Snow by Michael Kreihsl
 The Isle by Kim Ki-duk
 Juliet in Love by Wilson Yip
 Kaza-hana by Shinji Somai
 Kimono by Hal Hartley
 The King is Alive by Kristian Levring
 Kippur by Amos Gitaï
 Krámpack by Cesc Gay
 À la verticale de l'été by Tran Anh Hung
 Landscape by Martin Sulík
 The Last Resort by Paul Pawlikowski
 Little Cheung by Fruit Chan
 Lockdown by John Luessenhop
 Manila by Romuald Karmakar
 Me, You, Them by Andrucha Waddington
 The Mechanism by Djordje Milosavljevic
 Memento by Christopher Nolan
 La moitié du ciel by Alain Mazars
 The Monkey's Mask by Samantha Lang
 The Nine Lives of Tomas Katz by Ben Hopkins
 No Place to Go by Oskar Roehler
 Nuts for Love by Alberto Lecchi
 Peppermint by Costas Kapakas
 Petite chérie by Anne Villacèque
 Placido Rizzotto by Pasquale Scimeca
 Platform by Jia Zhangke
 The Price of Milk by Harry Sinclair
 Requiem for a Dream by Darren Aronofsky
 Risk by Alan White
 A Rumor of Angels by Peter O'Fallon
 Sade by Benoît Jacquot
 Samia by Philippe Faucon
 Seance by Kiyoshi Kurosawa
 Seven Songs From the Tundra by Anastasia Lapsui and Markku Lehmuskallio
 Shadow Magic by Ann Hu
 Signs & Wonders by Jonathan Nossiter
 Smell of Camphor, Fragrance of Jasmine by Bahman Farmanara
 Songs from the Second Floor by Roy Andersson
 The Stranger by Götz Spielmann
 Suzhou River by Lou Ye
 Swedish Beauty by Daniel Fridell
 Teeth by Gabriele Salvatores
 Thomas est amoureux by Pierre-Paul Renders
 A Time for Drunken Horses by Bahman Ghobadi
 To Die (Or Not) by Ventura Pons
 The Truth About Tully by Hilary Birmingham
 Two Family House by Raymond De Felitta
 Urbania by Jon Shear
 Vengo by Tony Gatlif
 La ville est tranquille by Robert Guédiguian
 Virgin Stripped Bare by Her Bachelors by Hong Sang-soo
 Une vraie jeune fille by Catherine Breillat
 Waiting for the Messiah by Daniel Burman
 Waiting List by Juan Carlos Tabío
 Walk the Talk by Shirley Barrett
 The Wedding by Pavel Lounguine
 When Brendan Met Trudy by Kieron J. Walsh
 When the Sky Falls by John Mackenzie
 Wild Blue: Notes for Several Voices by Thierry Knauff
 With Closed Eyes by Mansur Madavi

Discovery
 10 Minutes by Juan Carlos Rulfo
 101 Reykjavík by Baltasar Kormákur
 19 by Kazushi Watanabe
 Aïe by Sophie Fillières
 alaska.de by Esther Gronenborn
 Baise-moi by Virginie Despentes and Coralie Trinh Thi
 Bangkok Dangerous by Oxide Pang and Danny Pang
 Bunny by Mia Trachinger
 Chill Out by Andreas Struck
 Chopper by Andrew Dominik
 City Loop by Belinda Chayko
 Compassionate Sex by Laura Mañá
 The Day I Became A Woman by Marziyeh Meshkini
 Dust to Dust by Juan Carlos de Llaca
 Les filles ne savent pas nager by Anne-Sophie Birot
 George Washington by David Gordon Green
 The Girl by Sande Zeig
 In God We Trust by Jason Reitman
 Interstate 84 by Ross Partridge
 The Iron Ladies by Yongyoot Thongkongtoon
 Loners by David Ondrícek
 The Low Down by Jamie Thraves
 The Most Fertile Man in Ireland by Dudi Appleton
 Night Kiss by Boris Rodriguez Arroyo
 The Red One: Triumph by Oleg Pogodin and Vladimir Alenikov
 Scarlet Diva by Asia Argento
 Scoutman by Masato Ishioka
 Vulgar by Bryan Johnson
 The Young Unknowns by Catherine Jelski

Planet Africa
 Adanggaman by Roger Gnoan M'Bala
 Ali Zaoua by Nabil Ayouch
 Are You Cinderella? by Charles Hall
 Auguy by Munga Tunda Djo
 Bàttu by Cheick Oumar Sissoko
 Bye Bye Africa by Mahamat Saleh Haroun
 Christmas With Granny by Dumisani Phakathi
 The Elevator by Alrick Riley
 En Face by Zina Modiano and Mehdi Ben Attia
 Hijack Stories by Oliver Schmitz
 El Medina by Yousry Nasrallah
 One Week by Carl Seaton
 Passage du milieu by Guy Deslauriers
 La saison des hommes by Moufida Tlatli
 La Squale by Fabrice Genestal
 The Station by Aaron Woolfolk
 Tourbillons by Alain Gomis
 Vacances Au Pays by Jean-Marie Teno

Real to Reel
 Asylum by Chris Petit and Iain Sinclair
 Breathe In/Breathe Out by Beth Billingsly
 Calle 54 by Fernando Trueba
 Crazy by Heddy Honigmann
 Erik Bruhn: I'm the Same- Only More by Lennart Pasborg
 Fighter by Amir Bar-Lev
 The First and the Last... by Momir Matovic
 Gaea Girls by Kim Longinotto and Jano Williams
 Les glaneurs et la glaneuse by Agnès Varda
 Into the Arms of Strangers: Stories of the Kindertransport by Mark Jonathan Harris
 Jour de nuit by Dieter Fahrer and Bernhard Nick
 One Day in the Life of Andrei Arsenevich by Chris Marker
 Kalamandalam Gopi by Adoor Gopalakrishnan
 Keep the River On Your Right: A Modern Cannibal Tale by Laurie Gwen Shapiro and David Shapiro
 The Long Holiday by Johan van der Keuken
 The Man Who Bought Mustique by Joseph Bullman
 The Natural History of the Chicken by Mark Lewis
 Paragraph 175 by Rob Epstein and Jeffery Friedman
 The Prince is Back by Marina Goldovskaya
 La règle du je by Françoise Romand
 Soldiers in the Army of God by Marc Levin and Daphne Pinkerson
 The Turandot Project by Allan Miller
 Unchain by Toyoda Toshiaki

Dialogues: Talking with Pictures
 The Bicycle Thief by Vittorio de Sica
 Blue Velvet by David Lynch
 Do The Right Thing by Spike Lee
 Performance by Nicolas Roeg and Donald Cammell
 Raven's End by Bo Widerberg
 The Sacrifice by Andrei Tarkovsky

25th Anniversary Special Events
 25 x 25 (twenty-five digital video shorts made by attending filmmakers)
 Alexander Nevsky by Sergei Eisenstein
The Bloomberg Tribute to Stephen Frears
 Dangerous Liaisons by Stephen Frears
 The Grifters by Stephen Frears
 The Hit by Stephen Frears
 My Beautiful Laundrette by Stephen Frears
 Prick Up Your Ears by Stephen Frears
 Sammy and Rosie Get Laid by Stephen Frears

Year 1
 The Context by Francesco Rosi
 Cousin, cousine by Jean-Charles Tacchella
 Dersu Uzala by Akira Kurosawa
 The Devil's Playground by Fred Schepisi
 L'eau chaude l'eau frette by André Forcier
 Grey Gardens by Albert Maysles and David Maysles
 Harlan County, USA by Barbara Kopple
 Kings of the Road by Wim Wenders

Beckett on Film
 Act Without Words 1 by Karel Reisz
 Catastrophe by David Mamet
 Endgame by Conor McPherson
 Happy Days by Patricia Rozema
 Krapp's Last Tape by Atom Egoyan
 Not I by Neil Jordan
 Play by Anthony Minghella
 Rockaby by Sir Richard Eyre
 Rough For Theatre 1 by Kieron J. Walsh
 What Where by Damien O'Donnell

Preludes
Preludes was a special one-off program of ten short films by Canadian film directors, commissioned by TIFF to celebrate its 25th anniversary. The Preludes films were also subsequently screened on the web separately from their screenings at TIFF, on a platform funded by Bell Canada.

 Camera by David Cronenberg
 The Line by Atom Egoyan
 Congratulations by Mike Jones
 See You in Toronto by Jean Pierre Lefebvre
 The Heart of the World by Guy Maddin
 A Word from the Management by Don McKellar
 24fps by Jeremy Podeswa
 This Might Be Good by Patricia Rozema
 Prelude by Michael Snow
 Legs Apart by Anne Wheeler

Spotlight: Robert Beavers
 Amor by Robert Beavers
 From the Notebook of... by Robert Beavers
 The Painting by Robert Beavers
 Ruskin by Robert Beavers
 Sotiros by Robert Beavers
 The Stoas by Robert Beavers
 Wingseed by Robert Beavers
 Work Done by Robert Beavers

Canadian Open Vault
 Tit-Coq by Gratien Gélinas and René Delacroix

Midnight Madness
 6ixtynin9 by Pen-ek Ratanaruang
 The American Nightmare by Adam Simon
 The City of Lost Souls by Miike Takashi
 The Foul King by Kim Jeewoon
 The Irrefutable Truth about Demons by Glenn Standring
 The Mission by Johnnie To Kei-Fung
 Quartered at Dawn by Norbert Keil
 Tell Me Something by Chang Youn hyun
 Time and Tide by Tsui Hark
 Wild Zero by Tetsuro Takeuchi

References

External links
 Official site
 2000 Toronto International Film Festival at IMDb

2000 film festivals
2000
2000 in Toronto
2000 in Canadian cinema
2000 festivals in North America